Stephen Motika (born 1977 in Santa Monica, CA) is an American poet, editor, and publisher.

Life and work
Motika is the publisher of Nightboat Books, a literary non-profit publisher based in Brooklyn, NY. He is the editor of Leland Hickman's Tiresias: The Collected Poems of Leland Hickman (2009), and the author of the chapbooks "Arrival and At Mono" (2007) and "In the Madrones" (2011), both published by Sona Books. His first book of poems, Western Practice, was published by Alice James Books in April 2012.

Motika's work has appeared in Eleven Eleven, The Boog City Reader 4, The Poetry Project Newsletter, The National Post of Canada, Another Chicago Magazine, and The Common Review.

The Field, his collaboration with visual artist Dianna Frid, was on view at Gallery 400 at the University of Illinois, Chicago, in December 2003. He worked at Poets House in New York City from 2004 to 2018.

References

External links
Nightboat Books. Publisher's homepage
The Multifarious Array: A poetry reading series with mad pronunciation featuring Stephen Motika, Sue Nacey, and Peter Spagnuolo.
The Field features photos and information from Motika's collaboration with Dianna Frid.

1977 births
21st-century American male writers
21st-century American poets
American book publishers (people)
American male poets
Living people
Vassar College alumni